The Parti Rakyat Sarawak or PRS (English: Sarawak Peoples' Party) is a multiracialism & nationalism political party in Sarawak, and Malaysia at all. The party was founded in the wake of the de-registration of the Parti Bansa Dayak Sarawak and later Sarawak National Party in December 2003 by a breakaway faction led by Tan Sri Dr. James Jemut Masing and Dato' Sng Chee Hua. It is one of the former constituent members of the Barisan Nasional. PRS is currently the second largest local political party in Sarawak, after PBB. Following the fall of BN in the 2018 general election and in the aftermath of meeting between all Sarawak-based BN coalition parties on 12 June 2018, PRS left the coalition to form a new Sarawak-based coalition of Sarawak Parties Alliance.

Leadership structure 

 President:
 Dato' Joseph Salang Gandum
 Deputy Presidents:
 Majang Renggi

 Vice-Presidents:
 

 Spokeperson:

 Women Chief:
 Doris Sophia Brodie
 Deputy Women Chiefs:

 Vice Women Chiefs:

 Youth Chief:
 Datuk Snowdan Lawan
 Deputy Youth Chiefs:

 Vice Youth Chiefs:

 Secretary-General:
 Malcolm Mussen Lamoh
 Deputy Secretary-General:
 
 Special Advisor (Financial):

 Treasurer-General:
 
 Deputy Treasurer-General:

 Special Advisors (Undi 18):

 Information Chief:

 Deputy Information Chiefs:

 Electoral Strategies Chiefs:

 Central Committee Members:
 Lue Cheng Hing

Elected representatives

Dewan Negara (Senate)

Senators 

 His Majesty's appointee:
 Rita Sarimah Patrick Insol (PRS)

Dewan Rakyat (House of Representatives)

Members of Parliament of the 15th Malaysian Parliament 

PRS has 5 MPs in the House of Representatives.

Dewan Undangan Negeri (State Legislative Assembly)

Malaysian State Assembly Representatives 

Sarawak State Legislative Assembly

General election results

State election results

External links

See also 
 Politics of Malaysia
 List of political parties in Malaysia

References

Notes 
 Khoo, Phillip (June 2004) The Taming of the Dayak. Aliran Monthly

Political parties in Sarawak
2004 establishments in Malaysia
Political parties established in 2004